The following is a list of mayors of the municipality of Leeuwarden from 1821 until the present.

A mayor in the Netherlands is called a burgemeester (burgomaster). This is a list of mayors of the Dutch city and capital of Friesland, Leeuwarden.

Mayors of Leeuwarden

Notes 

Leeuwarden